Phoenixauchenia is an extinct genus of mammal, belonging to the family Macraucheniidae and the order Litopterna. It lived in Chile during the Miocene.

References

Macraucheniids
Miocene mammals of South America
Friasian
Neogene Chile
Fossils of Chile
Fossil taxa described in 1904
Taxa named by Florentino Ameghino
Prehistoric placental genera